The 1935 Liverpool West Toxteth by-election was held on 16 July 1935.  The by-election was held due to the appointment as a metropolitan police magistrate of the incumbent Conservative MP, Clyde Tabor Wilson.  It was won by the Labour candidate Joseph Gibbins.

Result

References

Liverpool West Toxteth by-election
Liverpool West Toxteth by-election
1930s in Liverpool
West Toxteth, 1935
Liverpool West Toxteth by-election